The 302nd Maneuver Enhancement Brigade is a unit of the U.S. Army Reserve based in Massachusetts.

Organization
It is a brigade of 2,200 Soldiers housed at a variety of locations throughout New England, New York and Pennsylvania. The 302nd MEB conducts Rear Area Operations for the Army Corps or Division.

The brigade is a tenant of Westover Air Reserve Base in Chicopee, Massachusetts. The headquarters moved from the Fort Devens military base in 2008, and continues to occupy a new nearly $31-million building with a variety of units from different branches of the military.

This unit is one of 21 combat support brigades (maneuver enhancement) the Army created: 18 in the Army National Guard, and 3 in the Army Reserve.

The organization is one of five types of multifunctional support brigades that have been be established under the transformation to the modular force. The others are the sustainment brigade, battlefield surveillance brigade, combat aviation brigade, and fires brigade.

Role

A maneuver enhancement brigade's (MEB) mission is to provide maneuver support to a force commander, normally at the division level. The MEB groups together a number of previously dispersed functions in order to achieve this goal. The MEB generally contains a signal and main support battalion. This force is then augmented by combat engineer, military police, air and missile defense, chemical defence. Depending on the mission it may be assigned explosive ordnance disposal (EOD), civil affairs or a tactical combat force. They are tailored with the capabilities required for each operation. More than one maneuver enhancement brigade may be assigned to a division or corps.

Subordinate units 

As of 2020 the following units are subordinate to the 302nd Maneuver Enhancement Brigade:

 365th Engineer Battalion
 368th Engineer Battalion
 479th Engineer Battalion

Unit insignia and heraldry
Shoulder sleeve insignia
On a vertical rectangular embroidered item coming to a 90-degree angular point at base, divided vertically, red and green, surmounted in the middle a blue pale throughout edged yellow, displaying a yellow double head fasces; all within a 1/8 inch (.32 cm) yellow border. Overall dimensions are 2 1/4 inches (5.72 cm) in width and 3 inches (7.62 cm) in height.
Symbolism
Red suggests the unit's engineer duties. The dark blue pale denotes the chemical capabilities of the brigade. The double head fasces and the green color symbolize the unit's key element of the military police capabilities and underscore their readiness to implement military duties.
Background
The  unit insignia was originally approved for the 302nd Combat Support Brigade (Maneuver Enhancement) effective 16 September 2008. It was amended to correct the unit designation to the 302nd Maneuver Enhancement Brigade.

References

External links
 U.S. Army Reserve
 Full listings of Reserve units
 Army Reserve

Maneuver Enhancement Brigades of the United States Army
Military units and formations of the United States Army Reserve